Holsted Municipality is a former municipality (Danish, kommune) in Region of Southern Denmark on the Jutland peninsula in southwest Denmark. The municipality covered an area of 190 km2, and had a total population of 6,965 (2005).  Its last mayor was Carl Aaskov, a member of the Venstre (Liberal Party) political party. The main town and site of its municipal council was the town of Holsted.

On January 1, 2007, Holsted municipality ceased to exist due to Kommunalreformen ("The Municipality Reform" of 2007).  It was merged with  Brørup, Rødding, and Vejen municipalities to form the new Vejen municipality.  This created a municipality with an area of 817 km2 and a total population of 41,350 (2005).

External links
 Municipality's official website

References

Former municipalities of Denmark